This is a list of incidents of violence against women in Spain. The Ministry of Health, Social Services and Equality publishes statistics on violence against women and counts every death. Also, media in Spain reports every case of violence against women that results in a death.

In the last decade about 700 women have been killed in Spain by their partners or ex-partners. Since 1999, the number of killed women is over 1,000.

Before 2003 
 November 13, 1992: Alcasser Girls: 3 teenage girls from Alcàsser, Valencia, Spain, were kidnapped, raped, assaulted and murdered after hitchhiking to get to a nightclub.
 April 12, 1993: Kidnapping of Anabel Segura: 2 men kidnap and later (when she was trying to escape) murder a 22-year-old woman.
 December 17, 1997: Ana Orantes:  After her testimony was shown on a television program, she was killed by her last husband. It caused a big repercussion about gender violence, and as a consequence, the restructuring of the Criminal Code of Spain.
 April 20, 1997: Murder of Eva Blanco:  Spanish high school student was murdered in Algete, Community of Madrid. The case remained unsolved until 2015
 October 9, 1999: Murder of Rocío Wanninkhof: a Dutch-Spanish teenage girl who was murdered in her hometown of Mijas
 December 2, 2001: Murder of Helena Jubany: a librarian who was murdered in Sabadell.

2003 

 May 17, 2003: Murder of Sandra Palo: A woman (22) is raped, run over by a car and burnt alive by 4 minors (in the 14-18 age range) in Madrid.
 May 24, 2003: A man (34) shoots his wife (29) in La Puebla de Híjar Teruel. He killed another woman in 2019.
 August 14, 2003: Murder of Sonia Carabantes: Murder of a 17-year-old girl that helped to solve the case of Rocío Wanninkhof
 January 24, 2009: Murder of Marta del Castillo:  a Spanish high school student who disappeared and was presumably murdered.

Summary 2003 to 2021 

Women killed in gender violence cases

2003: 71 women
2004: 72 women
2005: 57 women
2006: 69 women
2007: 71 women
2008: 76 women
2009: 56 women

2010: 73 women
2011: 62 women
2012: 52 women
2013: 54 women
2014: 55 women
2015: 60 women
2016: 49 women

2017: 50 women
2018: 53 women
2019: 55 women
2020: 47 women
2021: 43 women

2012 
Women killed in gender violence cases:

 June 30, 2012: A man kills and butchers his partner in Cadrete.

2015 

60 women were killed in Spain in cases of gender violence

 January 12: A man (70) kills his ex-partner (70) and her sister (64) in Elche. Later, he commits suicide. Five minutes of silence were observed for the double crime.
 January 17: A woman (69) is killed in Orba, Alicante. Her partner flees to Germany, where he confesses the crime at the airport to police. Silent demonstrations were held in Alicante and Valencia.
 January 21: A man (44) kills his wife (39) and then he commits suicide in Terrassa. They had a 6-year-old child. About 200 people meet in front of the city hall to protest against violence against women.
 February 4: A woman is stabbed to death by a man in Arrecife. They met some months previously.
 February 6: A woman is strangled in Ronda. About 30 people protest against the crime.
 February 12: A man (47) stabs to death his partner (38) in Valencia.
 March 9: A man (75) confesses to have killed his wife (76) six months before in San Miguel de Salinas.
 March 10: A woman (43) is killed by her partner in Xàbia.
 March 12: A woman (23) is thrown out of a van driven by her husband (24) in Cáceres and dies due to the injuries.
 March 29: A man kills his wife (31) in Alhaurín de la Torre and then he commits suicide. About 100 people gather in the city hall square to protest against the crime.
 March 30: A man shoots his wife (24) in Lleida and then attempts suicide.
 April 2: A man (34) stabs his wife (29) to death in Vitoria-Gasteiz.
 May 3: A man (50) kills his wife (47) and her boss (57) in Sorbas and Níjar respectively.

2016

Gender violence murders
49 women were killed in gender violence cases.
January 4: A man (41) strangles his partner (43) in Madrid.
January 5: A man stabs his partner (33) in Galápagos, Guadalajara. 
January 7: A man (27) drowns his partner (21) in a  swamp in Alange, Badajoz.
 January 11: A man is detained in Quintanar de la Orden, Toledo after his wife (59) is found stabbed. He is released 4 days later because it is found that the DNA of the knife was his brother's (the brother-in-law's victim), who confessed the crime. Investigation still does not rule out an involvement of the husband.
February 22: A man (41) shoots his ex-partner (37) in Zaragoza.
March 14: A man (46) is accused of stabbing his partner (34) in Gijón, Asturias. Finally he was sentenced to 4 years for reckless homicide as the judge considered that he had stabbed her in a struggle to try to pick the knife from her hands, but without intending to kill her.
April 12: A man (49) stabs his partner (48) in Benidorm, Alicante.
April 14: A mosso d'Esquadra (45) shoots his ex-partner (36) in front of their 7-year-old daughter. Then he commits suicide. In Sant Feliu de Llobregat, Barcelona. 
July 24: A man is arrested accused of suffocating his wife (49) in Bilbao. He was acquitted for lack of evidence in 2018.

Other cases
 July 7: La Manada sexual abuse case: A group of five men sexually abused an 18-year-old girl in a portal.
August 22: Murder of Diana Quer: An 18-year-old woman is abducted and murdered.
August 24, 2016: A man ties his ex-wife to her bed and beats her in front of their children in Villa de Vallecas.

2017

Gender violence murders
50 women were killed in gender violence cases.
January 4: A man (20) stabs and kills his partner (40) in Rivas-Vaciamadrid
January 15: A man (31) slays his ex-partner (33) in Huércal, Almería
January 17: A man confesses to have cut his wife's (48) throat and thrown the corpse to a river in Burlada, Navarre.
January 28: A man (59) stabs his wife (55) in O Carballino, Orense.
January 30: Woman (40) killed by her husband (40) in Seseña, Toledo
February 5: A man (44) stabs his wife (38) in Mora, Toledo.
February 7: A man (82) kills his wife (79) while she was sleeping in Súria, Barcelona.
February 11: A civil guard (31) shoots his partner (26) and later commits suicide in Seseña, Toledo.
February 13: A man (57) stabs to death his wife (46) and her daughter (18), his stepdaughter, in Daimiel, Ciudad Real.
February 19: A man (86) stabs his wife (79) in a nursing home care in Campello, Alicante.
February 20: A man (47) explodes two butane cylinders to kill his ex-partner (52) in Redondela, Pontevedra. Both die.
February 21: A man stabs his ex-partner (34) in Santa Perpetua, Barcelona.
February 21: A man (54) is arrested accused of throwing out his ex-partner (48) out of the hollow of a staircase of a building in Valencia.
February 21: A woman (47) appears dead in Gandía, Valencia. A man with restraining order is arrested.
February 22: In Villanueva del Fresno, Badajoz a woman (91) dies due to the stabbing wounds inflicted by her husband (91) two days prior. The sons does not consider this a gender violence case, but is counted as such by the Ministry.
March 1: A man slaughters his partner (32) and then manipulates the gas pipes to cause an explosion and commit suicide. In Madrid.
March 29: A man (47) strangles his wife (42) and smothers their two children (ages, 5 and 8). Then he commits suicide by throwing himself out the window. in Campo de Criptana, Ciudad Real.
March 31: A man (34) strangles his partner (23) and then surrenders to the police in Telde, Gran Canaria.
April 4: A man (36) beats to death his partner (44) and then tries to burn the house in La Laguna, Santa Cruz de Tenerife.
April 10: A man (24) beats to death his partner (29) in El Alquián, Almería and then commits suicide by hanging.
April 21: A man (38) strangles his partner (45) in Barcelona.
May 2: A man stabs and kills his partner (44) and their child in Alcobendas, Madrid.
May 5: A man strangles his wife (39), puts the corpse in a suitcase and throws it to a river in Alcolea del Río, Sevilla.
May 12: A man (40) kills ex-partner (27) and confesses to the police in Madrid.
May 21: A man sets fire to the car in which he and his partner (48) were, both burned to death in La Llagosta, Barcelona.
May 26: A woman (55) is strangled by her husband (61) who tries to commit suicide by stabbing himself. In Madrid.
May 27: A man (48) stabs his co-worker and ex-partner (31) in Molina de Segura, Murcia.
May 27: A man (43) strangles with a plastic bag his partner (37) in Collado Villalba, Madrid.
June 13: A man (51) shots his partner (55) in Las Gabias, Granada.
June 24: A man stabs his ex-partner (39) in front of her 6-year-old child in Seville.
June 25: A man (43) stabs his partner (29) in a car and surrenders to the police in Salou, Tarragona.
July 15: A man (71) kills with an axe his wife (66) in Huéscar, Granada.
July 17: A man beats to death his partner (38) and then burnts the house in Valencia.
August 2: A man (71) beats to death his wife (63) and surrenders to the police in Getafe, Madrid.
August 5: A man (39) beats to death his partner (38) in Santa Cruz de Tenerife.
August 16: A man (49) shots his partner (48) and then commits suicide in Totana, Murcia.
August 24: A woman (42) dies stabbed by her husband in Arroyo de la Luz, Cáceres. Although this death appears on the official list of the Ministry, the detainee was released in December of the same year when the investigation considered that this was a case of self-defense.
September 25: A man (22) stabs his ex-partner (20) in Cartagena, Murcia.
September 28: A man (33) slaughters his partner (32) and then commits suicide by throwing himself out of a window in Sestao, Biscay.
October 1: A man (33) shoots his partner (22) and their 15-month baby and commits suicide in Barcelona.
October 3: A man (49) stabs his ex-partner (45) in Miranda de Ebro, Burgos.
October 14: A man shots his ex-partner (66) in Rubí, Barcelona and is detained after trying to escape.
October 22: A man (38) strangles his partner (38) and then commits suicide in Cuevas del Almanzora, Almería.
November 1: A man (45) kills his partner (28) in Arona, Tenerife.
November 9: A man (31) shots his ex-partner (28) in front of a school and at the sight of their 3-year-old son and then commits suicide. In Elda, Alicante.
November 24: A German (41) drives a whole day to shoot his ex-partner (34) who was in Vinaròs, Castellón hiding from him. Then commits suicide.
November 30: A man (40) hits his wife (53), who dies in a hospital in Guadassuar, Valencia.
December 23: A man (29) forces his ex-partner (20) to ride in his car and then crashes it against a pole in Villareal, Castellón.
December 25: A man (35) stabs his partner (30) in Sant Adrià del Besòs, Barcelona. He is arrested after taking a lot of pills.
December 28: A man (40) stabs his partner (37) in front of their three children in Azuqueca, Guadalajara.

Other cases
January 4: A man (24) defenestrates his partner (26) in Madrid The man was charged for mistreatment, but not murder.
January 18: A man (78) suffocates his wife (79) with a pillow, then commits suicide. He left a note explaining that he did that to end her suffering as she had Alzheimer.
February 3: A father, (27) after an argument with his wife in a hospital in Madrid, picks up their 1-year-old child and throws himself out of a window, killing both.
May 18: A woman (55) denounces the partner (29) of her niece whom he had tried to strangle. He kills the complainant before the police can arrest him. In Caudete, Albacete.
May 24: A man (48) who had been accused of gender abuse by his wife (45) 7 years prior has a sex change during the judicial process and claims that Spanish gender violence law no longer applies to the case.
June 1: A man (44) hits his partner (31) and suffocates their 8-month old baby.
November 12: A man (28) murders his two-year-old daughter after learning that his partner (24) wanted to break up with him.

2018

Gender violence murders
50 were killed in gender violence cases .

 January 19: A man (68) stabs and kills his ex-partner (47) and has a car accident while trying to escape in Santa Cruz de Tenerife.
 January 29: A man (91) poisons his wife (90) in a nursing home care in Mazarambroz, Toledo.
 February 4: A man (73) denounces the disappearance of his wife (53) in Guadix (Granada) but finally confesses to have killed and buried her.
 February 12: A woman (43) disappears in Navia, Asturias. Her corpse is found 3 weeks later. A man (42) who was already infamous in the village for claiming to be his procurer is arrested and finally confesses the crime.
 March 7: A man stabs his partner (44) in La Viñuela, Málaga. 
 March 24: A man allegedly runs over his partner three times until he kills her in Toledo. 
 March 30: A woman (48) is allegedly suffocated by her old partner (38) in Albox (Almería)
 April 9: A man (41) stabs and kills his wife (40) in front of their children in Blanes, Girona. 
 April 11: A man (46) allegedly kills his wife (39) in Murcia. She was as Colombian human rights defendant who had to leave her country due to FARC threats.
 April 20: In Vitoria-Gasteiz a man kills his ex-wife (43) and her mother, barricades himself in his house while the police surround the building, throws himself out of the window and falls on an inflatable mattress prepared by firefighters that saves his life.
 April 30: A man (36) allegedly beats ex-partner (36) until killing her in Burgos.
 May 11: A man (24) shoots his partner (21) in a shooting range, then commits suicide, in Las Gabias, Granada.
 June 8: A man (64) stabs his wife (49) and then tries to burn the house in Las Palmas.
 June 17: A man (53) allegedly shoots his partner (44) in Guadahortuna, Granada.
 June 18: A man (48) suffocates his partner (40) then surrenders to the police in Badalona, Barcelona.
 June 18: A man shoots his wife (47) in O Porriño, Lugo. Then commits suicide.
 June 25: A man (39) strangles his partner (37) in Zaragoza.
 July 5: A man (47) beats his partner (44) and strangles her with a cable in Madrid.
 July 6: A man (88) beheads his Alzheimers suffering wife (84) and commits suicide by throwing himself of out a window in La Felguera, Asturias. One of their children objected to the classification of this case as gender violence.
 July 7: A man (33) disobeys a restraining order and stabs his partner (24) in Lepe, Huelva. He fled from the authorities, but he was detained the following day.
 July 9: A man (59) beats to death his wife (48) in Collado Villalba, Madrid.
 July 14: A man (45) strangles his partner (40) and suffocates their 3- and 5-year-old daughters. Then he hangs himself (he apparently was trying to pass it as a suicide pact with his wife). In La Orotava, Santa Cruz de Tenerife.
 July 18: A man (54) stabs his wife (57) in A Coruña.
 July 24: A retired cop (69) shoots his wife (62) in Astorga, León.
 August 6: A man (82) stabs his wife (78) in Barcelona.
 August 13: The torso of a woman (25) is found in an abandoned suitcase in a burnt industrial warehouse in Madrid. After identifying the corpse, police proceed to search for his partner (45) (self nicknamed "the king of cachopo"), who is finally found on November 16 working under a false identity in a pub in Zaragoza.
 August 14: A man (39) stabs his partner (21) in Dúrcal, Granada.
 August 19: A man (56) shoots his wife (50) in front of their two sons in Cabana de Bergantiños, A Coruña.
 August 23: A man (27) stabs his girlfriend (35). A few days before they had announced their marriage compromise. In Barcelona.
 August 27: A man (57) strangles his partner (60) in Orihuela, Alicante.
 August 27: A man (48) beats to death his wife (38). His mother helped him clean the crime scene. In Aoiz, Navarra.
 September 6: A man (67) allegedly kills his mother (92) and his Alzheimers suffering wife (68) in Zaragoza.
 September 8: A man (51) stabs his partner (29) in La Caridad, Asturias.
 September 8: A man (41) allegedly kills his partner (35), then fled from the authorities in Borriol, Castellón.
 September 9: A man (49) stabs his ex-partner (32) in Madrid. She had broken up with him when she realized he was married.
 September 15: A man (81) kills his wife (71) with a baseball bat in Barcelona.
 September 21: A man (51) hits his partner (41) with a clothes iron, then suffocates her in front of two of her children, in Úbeda, Jaén
 September 25: A man (49) kills his ex-partner (39) in Maracena, Granada.
 September 25: A man (38) slits the throat of his partner (25) in front of their daughters in Bilbao, Biscay.
 September 27: A man (46) stabs his partner (44) in El Morche, Málaga.
 October 6: A man (53) shoots his ex-partner (48) in the street, runs over one of her daughters while escaping and then hangs himself on a tree in Sant Joan les Fonts, Girona.
 October 11: A woman (30) appears dead in a landfill in Gádor, Almería. Two weeks later her partner (30) is detained while trying to catch a plane to Mauritania.
 October 19: The corpse of a woman (67) is found in a swamp in El Arenoso, Córdoba. Her husband (70) confessed the crime to the police.
 October 23: A man (51), with a criminal record for gender violence and sexual abuse stabs his ex-partner (36) in Seville.
 October 23: A man (47) burns a house with his wife (50) inside in Pamplona, Navarra.
 October 23: A man (40) allegedly shoots his ex-partner (33) then commits suicide in Finestrat, Alicante. (Still under investigation)
 November 16: A man (45) murders his ex-partner (36) in the shop where she worked in Palma de Mallorca.
 November 25: A man (48) stabs his ex-partner (42) in Monzón, Huesca.
 December 15: A sick woman (57) dies in Manresa, Barcelona after being bedridden in bed for several weeks. Her husband (63) failed to take care of her or call the doctors.
December 25: A woman (54) disappears in Cartagena, Murcia.After months of research police arrests her partner. The corpse has not appeared.

Other cases
 January 26: A man defenestrates a 27-year-old woman in Madrid. No sentimental relationship. 
 March 5: A 16-year-old woman is allegedly sexually abused by five men in Jaen.
March 22: Nine men in the range of 18–21 years old, are arrested in Alicante accused of raping 3 minors (14, 15 and 17 years old)
 March 27: In Castellón a man (46) with restraining order goes to his ex-partner's house. Since she wasn't there he tries to sexually abuse her daughter (22) but he is stopped by her grandmother's partner (70), who is killed in the process. The aggressor falls into a ditch while trying to run away and is detained.
 April 16: A man hits his partner and their 7-month-old baby with a bat with the inscription "Doma-esposas" ("Wife-tamer")
 April 30: A man allegedly sets fire to his ex-partner's apartment.
 May 3: A man is arrested after kidnapping his ex-partner for 3 days.
 May 3: A woman (33) is murdered in an open field in Castrogonzalo, Zamora. At first a shepherd is arrested, but finally the police end up arresting his 16-year-old son who tried to incriminate him.
May 17: A man (56) is arrested for allegedly holding his wife (66) and daughter (29) in his home for more than 4 months in Alcantarilla, Murcia.
 June 4: A man (35) kills his ex-sister in law (39) in Albacete. He was actually trying to go after his ex-wife.
 June 18: The corpse of a woman (36) appears floating in a pool of Ciutadella, Menorca. At first it was believed to be an accident, but in November, de 2019 her partner (40) was detained, charged with homicide.
 June 21: A prisoner (42) in regime of semi-freedom non fatally attacks his partner (40) with a hammer. The reason he was in prison is for killing another girlfriend with a hammer in 2002.
 August 13: A man (48) burns himself in Madrid after arguing with his partner (38) extending the fire around the building.
 September 12: A woman (35) escapes from his partner (37) who has kidnapped her for four months in Fuenlabrada, Madrid.
 September 25: A man (48) stabs his 3-year-old and 6-years-old daughters in revenge for his wife (42) having denounced him. Then commits suicide by throwing himself out of a window. In Castellón de la Plana.
 December 12: A woman (26) is murdered by an ex-convict (50) in El Campillo (Huelva)

2019

Gender violence murders
55 women were killed in gender violence cases.
January 4: A man (29) stabs his partner (26) in Laredo, Cantabria.
January 12: A man (50) stabs his ex-partner (47) in front of their son in Fuengirola (Málaga)
January 15: A man (95) beats his wife (95) in Toreno, León.
January 17: A man (50) stabs his partner (47) in Zaragoza. He had already killed another partner in 2003 and the new victim was his lawyer.
January 26: A man (68) kills his wife (69) with an axe in Dos Hermanas, Sevilla.
January 30: A man (19) hits and beheads his partner (17) in Reus, Tarragona.
February 3: A man (57) beats to death his partner (60), who was also his aunt, in Santa Cruz de Tenerife.
February 8: In the freezer of a man (42) is found the quartered corpse of his girlfriend (22) who disappeared in 2017. In Alcalá de Henares, Madrid.
February 9: A man (34) hits and slaughters his partner (29) and tries to pass it for a suicide. In Planes, Alicante.
March 8: A man (80) shoots his wife (63) in Madrid.
March 9: A man (55) stabs his wife (58) in Estepona, Málaga.
March 10: A man (46) kills his wife (43) with a shotgun in Valga, Pontevedra.
March 25: A man (49) kills his wife (39) and then kills himself in Loeches, Madrid. Their 11-year-old daughter was the one calling the police.
April 2: A Hungarian man (47) who has just arrived to Spain, kills his partner (40) in Rojales, Alicante.
April 7: A man (22) confesses where he buried his girlfriend (26), who had disappeared on February 17. In Vinaròs, Castellón.
April 11: A man (45) beats to death his partner (42) in Mogán, Gran Canaria.
April 20: A national policeman (38) shots his partner (44) in Olot, Girona.
April 23: A woman (39) travels from Germany to Tenerife to visit her ex-husband (43) and their sons. He kills her and their 10-year-old daughter in a cave. Their 6-year-old son escapes and alerts the police.
May 1: The stabbed corpse of a woman (47) is found in Parla, Madrid. She went back to live with his boyfriend (42), despite him having been already denounced 3 times by her for mistreatment.
May 9: A woman (42) appears in her bed dead, naked and with a flower in her bust. Her partner (39) is arrested at the airport. In Torre Pacheco, Murcia.
May 30: A man (47) shoots his partner (39) in the head in Agüimes, Las Palmas de Gran Canaria.
 June 3: A man (53) shots his wife (51) with a shotgun, then commits suicide in Iznájar, Córdoba.
 June 10: A man (48) stabs his partner (29)because she wanted to break up with him. In Alboraya, Valencia. She is the 1000th murdered women since there are official data in 2003.
 June 14: A woman (49) dies stabbed by his partner (46), who was on probation after having murdered his previous wife in 2002 with an iron cord. After killing her, he set the building on fire, also dying. In Córdoba.
 July 2: A man (42) kills his wife (42) with a hammer in Rute, Córdoba and later surrenders to the police.
July 3: Police found evidence that a woman (25) found dead on 9 September 2018 in Granollers, Barcelona had been murdered by her husband.
July 13: A woman (47) is stabbed by her husband in Elche, Alicante.
July 15: In Almería the heavily decomposed corpse of a woman (39) is found. Autopsy determined she had been stabbed. Police detains her partner (50). 
July 17: A member of the armed forces (57) shoots his wife (54) with a rifle in Cortes de la Frontera, Málaga.
July 21: A man (50) stabs his ex-partner (47) then he hangs himself in Vilalba, Lugo.
July 22:  man (61) stabs his wife (57) in the heart in Calp, Alicante.
July 24: A man kills his ex-partner (47) in Terrassa, Barcelona.
July 29: A man (56) stabs his wife (52) then tries to escape but dies hitting his car with a tree. In Escalante, Cantabria.
July 31: A man (56) shots his wife (55) and harms their son (29) in Villagonzalo Pedernales, Burgos.
August 2: A man (22) hits to death his ex-partner (21) in Hospitalet de Llobregat, Barcelona.
August 16: A man (43) ties his partner (48) and stabs her in Madrid.
August 18: A man (79) hits to death his wife (74) with an iron stick in Jaén.
September 16: A man (41) shots his former wife (39), former mother in law (59) and former sister in law (27) in Valga, Pontevedra.
September 18: A man (39) stabs his partner (31) in front of their daughters (10 and 8 years old) in Madrid.
September 22: A German woman (59) is stabbed by his partner (59) in Mallorca.
September 25: It is found in Málaga the corpse of a woman (31) disappeared since June, 12.
October 20: A man shots (43) 5 times his wife (40) then commits suicide. In La Zubia, Granada.
October 31: A man (52) stabs his wife (41) in Castellbisbal, Barcelona.
November 25: A man (29) cuts the throat of his partner (26) in Abona, Tenerife.
November 29: A man (93) kills with cold weapon his wife in (86) en Iznájar, Córdoba.
December 2: A man (44) cuts the throat of his partner (36) in El Prat de Llobregat, Barcelona.

Other cases
January 1: 4 men (19, 21, 22 and 24 years old) rape a woman (19) in Callosa d'en Sarrià, Alicante.
January 8: A sentence of Supreme Court of Spain concludes that a man hitting his (female) partner is always gender violence, even if both have mutually hit each other.
 February 3: Six men are detained for allegedly gang raping an 18-year-old woman in Sabadell, Barcelona.
November 30: A man was arrested for the alleged murder of his wife (38) in Vicálvaro, Madrid, but was acquitted in March 2020 when the autopsy confirmed that the cause of death was a heart attack.

2020

Gender violence murders
45 women were killed in gender violence cases.
January 6: A man (27) is arrested accused of killing his partner (28) and their 3 year old daughter in Esplugues de Llobregat, Barcelona.
January 12: A man (53) shots his partner (61) then commits suicide. In Puertollano, Ciudad Real.
January, 18: A Mosso d'Esquadra (42) shots his partner (29) in Terrassa, Barcelona.
January, 22: A man (50) kills his wife (43) in front of their 11 and 14 years old sons. In La Puebla de Almoradiel, Toledo.
January, 22: A man (77) stabs his wife (73) in Caniles, Granada.
January, 25: A man (81) stabs his wife (79), then commits suicide. In A Pastoriza, Lugo. The family indicates that the aggressor had senile dementia.
January, 28: A man (45) suffocates his partner (40) in Sant Joan Despí, Barcelona and is arrested at the airport while he was trying to escape.
February 3: An ex-legionary allegedly kills in Gijón, Asturias, his ex-partner, then escapes.
February 7: A man (47) beheads his partner (49) in Lugo.
February 8: A legionary (24) stabs his expartner (38) in Granada.
February 17: A man (59) stabs his partner (34) in Moraira, Alicante.
February 26: A man (51) shoots his wife (43) in front of their 4 years old son, then commits suicide. In Aznalcóllar, Sevilla.
February 26: A man (76) stabs his wife (75) in Fuenlabrada, Madrid.
March 2: A man (69) stabs his ex-wife (65) in Posadas, Córdoba then tries to commit suicide.
March 9: A man shot his girlfriend (37) in Villanueva de Castellón, Valencia.
March 11: A man (60) stabs his wife (56) and their daughter (24) in Abanto Zierbena, Biscay.
March 19: A man (35) kills his wife (35) in front of their children in Almassora, Castellón.
April 4: A man (62) strangles his wife (78) in Las Palmas de Gran Canaria.
May 3: A man (45) allegedly stabs his partner (36) in Tenerife.
May 27: A man (75) stabs his partner (65) in L'Escala, Girona, then hangs himself.
May 30: A man (55) stabs his partner (51) in Esplugues de Llobregat, Barcelona.
June 14: A man (52) stabs his wife (46) and their 12 and 17 years ol sons in Úbeda, Jaén.
July 13: A man kills his partner (31) by hitting her head in Torrejón de Ardoz, Madrid. He told Emergencies that she had choked on a thorn.
July 14: A man (35) beheads his wife (21) in front of their 3 years old son. In Barcelona.
July 20: A man kills her partner and hides her body in a septic tank in La Corujera, Tenerife.
July 21: A man beats to death her partner (52) in Mallorca.
August 5: A man mortally hits his wife (83) in her head in Corral-Rubio, Albacete and dies while trying to flee.
August 8: A homeless woman (44) is killed by her partner in La Línea de la Concepción, Cádiz.
August 15: A man (44) kills in the street his ex-partner (37). Then he committed suicide. In La Granja de San Ildefonso, Segovia.
August 19: After a month in a hospital, dies a woman (61) whose ex-husband hit her with a hammer. In Cartagena, Murcia.
August 31: In a car in Valencia it is found the corpse of a woman (33). Her partner was captured in Switzerland.
September 10: a man (55) hits to death his partner (57) with a hammer. She used a wheelchair. In Jerez de la Frontera, Cádiz.
September 17: The corpse of a woman (29) appears in Santander. She was missing since August and her boyfriend was already in jail as he was a suspect.
September 24: A man (24) kills his partner (26) in Valencia./
September 25: A couple dies in what seemed to be a traffic accident in Cádiz, but the autopsy proved that the woman (32) had already died days ago after being hit in her head.
October 15: An ex-military man (36) shoots his partner (37) then commits suicide in Peguera, Mallorca. Autopsy ruled out a suspected suicide pact.
November 3: A man (35) hits his wife (32) with a rock and tries to hide the corpse behind a bush. In Palma de Mallorca.
November 8: A man stabs his wife (59) in Gondomar, Pontevedra.
November 9: A man strangles his wife (49) in Lloret de Mar.
December 2: An ex-policeman (86) shots his wife (84). She had alzheimer. In Palomares del Río, Sevilla.
December 27: A man (46) stabs his wife (50) in her neck in Villarrubia de los Ojos, Ciudad Real.
December 30: A man (43) confess the murder of a woman (65) in Gáldar, Province of Las Palmas. He had burnt and bury the body.
December 31: A man (37) stabs his wife (28) in front of their 8 and 10 years old children. In Torrejón de Ardoz, Madrid.

2021

Gender violence murders
44 women were killed in gender violence cases.
January 17: A man( 84) kills his wife (82) in Madrid.
February 12: A man (57) kills his wife (56) with an axe in Sestao, Biscay then commits suicide by throwing himself to the river.
February 13: A man (61) shots his ex-partner (52) then shots himself. In Majadahonda, Madrid.
March 2: A man (48) stabs his ex-partner (48) in Torrejón de Ardoz, Madrid.
March 8: A man (45) stabs and shots his partner (45) and their daughter (11), then commits suicide. In El Molar, Madrid.
April 14: a man (40) suffocates his partner (36) in Manresa, Barcelona.
April 19: A man (28) mortally hits his ex-partner (36) in her head. In Mansilla de las Mulas, León.
April 26: A man (37) pours gasoline over his ex-partner (50) and burnt her. In La Bisbal del Panadés, Tarragona.
April 27+: A man (37) kidnapped his two children (6) and (1) and took them in a boat, the 6 year old's body was found in a bag weighed down by an anchor, he had previously told his partner she would never see her children again.
May 9: A man (60) disobeys the restraining order, slaughters his partner (60) and commits suicide by throwing himself out of a window. In Sagunto, Valencia.
May 17: A man (35) kills his wife (28) and their 7 years old son. In Sa Pobla, Mallorca.
May 18: A man (56) shots his wife (52) in Creixell, Tarragona.
May 18: A man (50) stabs his wife (46) in Corbera de Llobregat, Barcelona.
May 20: A man (51) shots his wife (48) in Pola de Laviana, Asturias.
May 23: A man (31) stabs his wife (35) then tries to commit suicide by throwing himselsf from a window. In Zaragoza.
May 29: A man (54) stabs his wife (41) in Alovera, Guadalajara.
June 3: A man (45) stabs his wife (48) in Porqueres, Girona.
June 5: A man(66) shots his wife (59) in Pozuelo de Alarcón, Madrid.
June 10: A man (23) confesses to the murder of his ex wife (17). He killed her in June, 2. In Martín de la Jara, Sevilla.
June 12: A man (35) runs over his partner (36) in Marmolejo, Jaén.
June 15: A man (84) kills his wife (81) hitting her with a hammer in Moratalaz, Madrid.
June 21: A man (58) stabs his wife (56) in Valladolid.
June 29: A woman (34) who had been in the hospital dies a week after being stabbed by her partner (69) in Salamanca el 21 de junio. He committed suicide by hanging.
June 29: A man (43) stabs his partner (34) in front of their 3 children. She had asked for a divorce. In Barbastro, Huesca.
July 6: An ex-convict (41) stabs her partner (43) in front of her children. In Murchante, Navarra.
July 15: A man shots (55) in a street of Málaga his expartner (46). 
July 21: A man (79) hits his wife (74) in Pozuelo de Alarcón, Madrid.
July 22: A man (61) kills his partner (38) and hides the corpse in a trunk for two days before confessing to the police. In Sabadell, Barcelona.
July 30: A man (30) kills his wife, then commits suicide in San Vicente de Castellet (Barcelona).
July 31: A man (50)kills his expartner (25) in Cambrils, Tarragona.
August 10: A man shots his partner, then commits suicide in Sevilla.
September 13: A man (52) kills his wife (32) then commits suicide by throwing himself from a bridge. In Villajoyosa, Alicante.
September 16: A man (48) kills his wife (52) in A Coruña. He had a history of gender violence against two other women.
October 8: A woman is strangled by her partner in Lorca, Murcia.
October 12: A man murders his partner and commits suicide in Vitoria.
October 29: A man (70) dismembers his partner (68) and throws the remains into a container, where they are found by a homeless man. In Torrevieja, Alicante. 
November 7: A man (44) stabs his ex-partner (37) in San Roque, Cádiz.
 December 4: A man (35) stabs his partner 830) in Valencia and tries to pretend it has been a robbery.
December 12: A man (44) stabs his partner (39) in Granada.
December 16: A man (63) shoots his wife (64) and commits suicide. In Sant Joan les Fonts, Gerona
December 17: A man (43) kills his ex-partner (40) and their 11-month-old daughter in Villaescusa, Cantabria. Then he surrenders to the Police.
December 18: A man (39) with a history of gender violence with previous partners, beat his partner to death (35) in Torrevieja, Alicante.
December 25: A man (21) shots her partner (25) en Elche, Alicante and flees. He is detained 4 days later.

2022

Gender violence murders
January 17: A man (40) stabs his wife (38) in Tudela, Navarre.
January 25: A man (48) stabs his wife (50) in Algarinejo, Granada, then commits suicide by shooting himself.
February 9: Police found the corpse of a girl (17), in a storage, murdered by her boyfriend (19). In Totana, Murcia. 
February 19: A man (52) kills his wife (51) in Martorell, Barcelona.
March 2: A man (42) stabs his expartner in Pozuelo de Alarcón, Madrid. Tenía orden de alejamiento.
March 3: A man (48) shot his ex-partner (45) when she was leaving work. He then committed suicide. In Maqueda, Toledo.
March 14: A policeman (48) shot and killed his wife (47) in Ceuta.
March 21: A man (28) suffocates his ex-partner (25) in Barcelona.
April 4: A man (43) lethally stabs his exwife (46), wounds a friend of hers and self-harms. In Nohales, Cuenca
May 2: A man (38) murdered his wife (43) with a knife in front of their three children. 
August 10: A woman (33) was stabbed to death by her husbands Uncle (64) before he died after jumping from a window.
November 6: A man (38) stabbed his wife (29) and daughter (6) to death in Madrid. 
November 7: A man (80) with prior charges of domestic abuse, stabbed his wife (69) to death.
December 4: A British Man (68) was arrested for suspected murder of his partner (57). There had been several police complains against him between 2007 and 2014 
December 7: A woman (61) was strangled to death, possibly by her son (26).
December 26: A man (69) killed his partner (88) in Barcelona. 
December 28: A 9 month pregnant woman (34), was allegedly stabbed to death by her ex-partner (52) who had a history of domestic violence.
December 28: A man (37) stabbed his ex-step-daughter (20) to death in Madrid before self-harming.

See also 
 Violence against migrant agricultural workers in Spain
 List of incidents of violence against women

References

External links 
 Violence against women in Ministry of Health website 
 MUJERES ASESINADAS EN ESPAÑA POR VIOLENCIA DE GÉNERO y MACHISTA en 2020 in ibasque.com 

Incidents of violence against women
Violence
2015 murders in Spain
2016 murders in Spain
2017 murders in Spain
2021 murders in Spain
2022 murders in Spain
History of women in Spain